Peter Louis Kapusta (February 3, 1924 – July 16, 2016) was a Canadian ice hockey forward who played nine AHL seasons with Providence Reds.

Awards and achievements
Calder Cup (AHL) Championship (1961)
“Honoured Member” of the Manitoba Hockey Hall of Fame

References

Pete Kapusta's biography at Manitoba Hockey Hall of Fame

1924 births
2016 deaths
Canadian ice hockey forwards
Ice hockey people from Manitoba
Providence Reds players
St. Boniface Canadiens players
Winnipeg Warriors (minor pro) players